Ben Ryan may refer to:

 Ben Ryan (rugby union) (born 1971), Fiji sevens head coach
 Ben Ryan (composer) (1892–1968), American songwriter
 Ben Ryan (umpire), Australian rules football umpire